Big O or The Big O may refer to:

Fiction
 The Big O, a 1999 Japanese animated TV series

Mathematics and computing
 Big Omega function (disambiguation), various arithmetic functions in number theory
 Big O notation, asymptotic behavior in mathematics and computing
 Time complexity in computer science, whose functions are commonly expressed in big O notation

People
 Omar Gooding (born 1976), American actor, rapper, voice artist and comedian
 Oliver Miller (born 1970), former professional basketball player
 Takashi Nagasaki (born 1958), Japanese author
 Barack Obama (born 1961), 44th President of the United States 
 Roy Orbison (1936–1988), American singer-songwriter
 Glenn Ordway (born 1951), Boston-area sports radio host
 Otis Redding (1941–1967), American soul singer-songwriter and record producer
 Oscar Robertson (born 1938), former professional basketball player
 Oscar Santana, American radio personality
 Oprah Winfrey (born 1954), American television host, producer and philanthropist
 Oscar McInerney (born 1994), Australian rules footballer

Structures and venues
 Big O (Ferris wheel), the world's largest centerless Ferris wheel, in Japan
 Big "O", a structure on Skinner Butte in Eugene, Oregon, United States, listed on the National Register of Historic Places
 Olympic Stadium (Montreal), Quebec, Canada; the main venue of the 1976 Summer Olympics
 Ontario Motor Speedway, California, USA; former superspeedway racecar track

Other uses
 Omega (Ω), a Greek letter, whose name translates literally as "great O"
 Big O Tires, a tire retailer in the United States and Canada
 The Big O (album), by Roy Orbison
 Big Orange Chorus, a barbershop men's chorus in Jacksonville, Florida

See also
 Bigo (disambiguation)